Annabelle Moore (born Annabella Whitford, July 6, 1878 – November 29, 1961), also known as Peerless Annabelle, was an American dancer and actress who appeared in numerous early silent films. She was the original Gibson Girl in the 1907 Ziegfeld Follies.

Life and career

Annabelle Whitford was born in Chicago. She made her debut at age 15 dancing at the World's Columbian Exposition in Chicago in 1893. She later moved to New York City, where she performed in several films for the Edison Studios and appeared on Broadway.

Annabelle was quite popular in her youth. The sale of her films was further boosted in December 1896 when it was revealed that she had been approached to appear naked at a private dinner party at Sherry's Restaurant. It was said she introduced eroticism in film.

She married Edward James Buchan in 1910. He died in 1958.

Although she was very popular before her marriage, Annabelle died penniless in Chicago in 1961.

Selected filmography
1897
Sun Dance - Annabelle 
Butterfly Dance
Annabelle Serpentine Dance
1896
Annabelle in Flag Dance
Butterfly Dance
Serpentine Dance by Annabelle
Tambourine Dance by Annabelle
1895
1895 Annabelle Serpentine Dance
1894
Annabelle Butterfly Dance
Annabelle Sun Dance

Other work
The Charity Girl (1912)
The Happiest Night of His Life (1911)
Ziegfeld Follies of 1909 (in scene with Grace La Rue, Nora Bayes and Lucy Weston)
Ziegfeld Follies of 1908 
The Belle of Mayfair (1906)
A Venetian Romance (1904)
The Sleeping Beauty and the Beast (1901)
The Sprightly Romance of Marsac (1900)

References

External links

1878 births
1961 deaths
Actresses from Chicago
Actresses from New York (state)
American female dancers
Dancers from New York (state)
American film actresses
19th-century American actresses
American stage actresses
American silent film actresses
20th-century American actresses
Articles containing video clips